Nurney may refer to:

Nurney, County Carlow, Ireland
Nurney, County Kildare, Ireland
Nurney GAA (County Kildare)
David Nurney, artist